The canton of Nogent-sur-Seine is an administrative division of the Aube department, northeastern France. Its borders were modified at the French canton reorganisation which came into effect in March 2015. Its seat is in Nogent-sur-Seine.

It consists of the following communes:
 
Barbuise
Bouy-sur-Orvin
Courceroy
Ferreux-Quincey
Fontaine-Mâcon
Fontenay-de-Bossery
Gumery
La Louptière-Thénard
Marnay-sur-Seine
Le Mériot
Montpothier
La Motte-Tilly
Nogent-sur-Seine
Périgny-la-Rose
Plessis-Barbuise
Pont-sur-Seine
Saint-Aubin
Saint-Nicolas-la-Chapelle
La Saulsotte
Soligny-les-Étangs
Traînel
Villenauxe-la-Grande
La Villeneuve-au-Châtelot

References

Cantons of Aube